Adelina is an unincorporated community located along Adelina Road in Calvert County, Maryland, United States. Taney Place was listed on the National Register of Historic Places in 1972.

References

Unincorporated communities in Calvert County, Maryland
Unincorporated communities in Maryland